The Haehnel Building is a historic commercial building in east-central Austin, Texas. The building was constructed c. 1880 and served many commercial purposes throughout the 20th century. It was known as Shorty's Bar, a popular hangout for the local population (largely African-American).

In 1999 the building underwent a renovation as part of a larger renewal project for east downtown Austin.

The building is located at 1101 E. 11th Street. It was added to the National Register of Historic Places on September 17, 1985.

References

Buildings and structures in Austin, Texas
National Register of Historic Places in Austin, Texas
Commercial buildings on the National Register of Historic Places in Texas